Burton Nodella (May 26, 1924  February 23, 2016), also known as Cary Nodella, was an American television producer, most notably for the cult classic Get Smart.

World War II
The Brooklyn native served in the United States Army in World War II under General George S. Patton Jr., survived conflicts at Omaha Beach, the Battle of the Bulge and lastly helped liberate the Bergen-Belsen concentration camp.

Career
Burt Nodella produced 47 episodes during seasons three and four of the 1960s comedy series Get Smart, wrote a couple of installments and appeared as a KAOS doctor in another. He won two Emmy Awards in 1968 and 1969 for producing the series. He also contributed to The Tim Conway Show (1970) and CBS Summer Playhouse, as well as various television movies.

Personal life
In 1946, Nodella attended UCLA where he met Joanne Davis. They married in 1947 and had two children.

From 1968 to 1979, Nodella dated model and actress Barbara Feldon, who played "Agent 99" on 
Get Smart.

He spent his remaining years living  on his boat in Marina Del Rey.

Death
Burt Nodella died on February 23, 2016, aged 91, and was survived by his two children, Matthew Nodella and Carrie Kane, and extended family.

References

External links

1924 births
Place of birth missing
2016 deaths
American television producers
American television writers
American male television writers
United States Army personnel of World War II